The Fürstenrieder Straße is an almost five-kilometer-long important inner-city connecting road in Munich. It is named after the Fürstenried Palace, which lies near its southern end.

Route 
The Fürstenrieder Straße leads through the districts of Laim, Sendling-Westpark and Hadern to the northern edge of Fürstenried and forms a section of the only partially completed Outer Ring. Over almost its entire length it is made up of six-lanes with a green central strip. It is also part of the shortest inner-city connection between the Bundesautobahn 8 (Westast) and the Bundesautobahn 95.

The road starts at Landsberger Straße in Laim as the southern continuation of Wotanstraße. It runs in a straight line to the south, crosses Agnes-Bernauerstraße and Gotthardstraße and crosses the Bundesautobahn 96 at junction 38. It passes close to Westpark, from which it is separated only by several school buildings (Erasmus-Grasser-Gymnasium, Ludwigsgymansium). It then passes Waldfriedhof to the east. It crosses under the Bundesautobahn 95 leading into the city at exit 2 Kreuzhof and changes there into Boschetsrieder Straße and therefore into a west-eastern tangential road of the Outer Ring.

History 

The current route of Fürstenrieder Straße used to be an alleyway connecting Nymphenburg Palace and Fürstenried Palace. The expansion into an inner-city main road already began in the 1950s before the Munich General Traffic Plan was drawn up in 1963, in which it was included as part of the Tangente 5-West.

From 1948 to 1966, a trolleybus line ran through the Fürstenrieder Straße (until 1961 as line O32).

Since 2005, the construction of a tram in Fürstenrieder Straße has been the subject of controversial discussion, and the timetable for its implementation is still open.

See also 
 Fürstenrieder Straße 255
 Fürstenrieder Straße 257

References 

Streets in Munich
Buildings and structures in Munich